Kalateh-ye Qalichi (also Romanized as Kalāteh-ye Qalīchī) is a village in Qasabeh-ye Gharbi Rural District, in the Central District of Sabzevar County, Razavi Khorasan Province, Iran. At the 2006 census, its population was 14, in 4 families.

References 

Populated places in Sabzevar County